Craignure is a village and the main ferry port on the Isle of Mull, Argyll and Bute, Scotland. The village is within the parish of Torosay.

Geography
The village is located around Craignure Bay, on Mull's east coast. It has a population of roughly 200 people. Close to the village are two castles: Torosay and Duart.

Transport

Ferry

A regular ferry service connects Craignure with mainland Scotland via the Sound of Mull. The original pier, on the south side of the bay, was built in 1894. The present pier, on the west side of the bay, was built in 1964. Ferries run every two hours (3 to 5 times per day during the winter, & up to 10 times per day during the summer) between Craignure and Oban (on the mainland) by CalMac.

Road
Craignure is situated on the A849, an indirect route between Salen and Fionnphort. The village is served by buses to Fionnphort and Tobermory.

Railway
Craignure railway station was on the now closed narrow gauge Isle of Mull Railway.

See also
List of places in Argyll and Bute

References

External links

Canmore - Mull, Craignure site record
Canmore - Mull, Craignure site record
Canmore - Cnoc Nan Cubairean, Old Burial Ground site record

Villages on the Isle of Mull